Unidos y organizados is an Argentine political coalition, composed by minor organizations that supported the presidency of Cristina Fernández de Kirchner. It includes La Cámpora, the Evita Movement (Movimiento Evita), the Humanist party, the Communist party, the Peronist Youth (Juventud Peronista), Nuevo Encuentro, Frente Transversal, M.I.L.E.S. and Corriente de Liberación Nacional (KOLINA). The name was taken from a speech of Cristina Fernández at José Amalfitani Stadium on April 27, 2012.

References

Bibliography

External links
 Official Facebook page 

Political party alliances in Argentina
2012 establishments in Argentina
Political parties established in 2012
Presidency of Cristina Fernández de Kirchner